Hojjatabad (also Romanized as Ḩojjatābād; also known as ‘Emādābād) is a village in Aliabad Rural District, in the Central District of Anbarabad County, Kerman Province, Iran. At the 2006 census, its population was 695, in 156 families.

References 

Populated places in Anbarabad County